The following is a list of the members of the seventeenth Knesset, elected on 28 March 2006 and inaugurated 4 May 2006, and their replacements.

Knesset members

1 This title, in Hebrew ממלא מקום ראש הממשלה (Memale Mekom Rosh HaMemshala, lit. Prime Minister's Place Filler), means Livni was first in line to replace the Prime Minister in case of incapacitation or death; it does not mean she actually exercised any Prime Ministerial duties.

² Labour successfully filed a lawsuit, alleging electoral fraud in several Arab settlements and requesting an additional seat at the expense of the United Arab List. Zakour was replaced by Labour's Shakib Shanan.

3 Gil parliamentary group split in April 2008, with MKs Sharoni, Marom and Glazer forming the Justice for the Elderly faction. In October 2008, Sharoni and Marom reunited with Gil, leaving Glazer to form The Right Way parliamentary group.

Replacements

See also
List of Likud Knesset members
Arab members of the Knesset

References

External links
All past and present members Knesset website 

 
17